Škoda Auto has produced the following vehicles since its inception in 1895 (as Laurin & Klement before 1925).

Current models

Historic models

1900s

 Laurin & Klement A (1905–07)
 Laurin & Klement B (1906–08)
 Laurin & Klement C (1906–08)
 Laurin & Klement D (1906–07)
 Laurin & Klement E (1906–09)
 Laurin & Klement B2 (1907–08)
 Laurin & Klement C2 (1907–08)
 Laurin & Klement F (1907–09)
 Laurin & Klement FF (1907)
 Laurin & Klement FC (1907–09)
 Laurin & Klement HO/ HL/HLb (1907–13)
 Laurin & Klement BS (1908–09)
 Laurin & Klement FCS (1908–09)
 Laurin & Klement G (1908–11)
 Laurin & Klement DO/DL (1909–12)
 Laurin & Klement FDO/FDL (1909–15)
 Laurin & Klement EN (1909–10)
 Laurin & Klement FN/GDV/RC (1909–13)
 Laurin & Klement FCR (1909)
 Laurin & Klement L/LO (1909–11)

1910s

 Laurin & Klement ENS (1910–11)
 Laurin & Klement K/Kb/LOKb (1911–15)
 Laurin & Klement LK (1911–12)
 Laurin & Klement S/Sa (1911–16)
 Laurin & Klement DN (1912–15)
 Laurin & Klement RK (1912–16)
 Laurin & Klement Sb/Sc (1912–15)
 Laurin & Klement M/Mb/MO (1913–15)
 Laurin & Klement MK/400 (1913–24)
 Laurin & Klement O/OK (1913–16)
 Laurin & Klement Sd/Se/Sg/Sk (1913–17)
 Laurin & Klement Ms (1914–20)
 Laurin & Klement Sh/Sk (1914–17)
 Laurin & Klement T/Ta (1914–21)
 Laurin & Klement Si/Sl/Sm/So/200/205 (1916–24)
 Laurin & Klement Md/Me/Mf/Mg/Mh/Mi/Ml/300/305 (1917–23)

1920s

 Laurin & Klement MS/540/545 (1920–23)
 Laurin & Klement Škoda 545 (1924–27)
 Škoda 422 (1929–32)
 Škoda 430 (1929–36)
 Škoda 645 (1929–34)
 Škoda 860 (1929–32)

1930s

 Škoda 650 (1930–34)
 Škoda 633 (1931–34)
 Škoda 637 (1932–35)
 Škoda 420 Standard/Rapid/Popular (1933–38)
 Škoda Rapid (1935–47)
 Škoda Favorit (1936–41)
 Škoda Superb (1934–43)

1940s

 Škoda Superb OHV (1946–49)
Škoda 1101 Tudor (1946–49)
Škoda 1102 (1948–52)
 Škoda VOS (1949–52)

1950s

 Škoda 1200 (1952–55)
Škoda 440/445/450 (1955–59)
 Škoda 1201 (1955–62)
 Škoda Felicia (1959–64)
 Škoda Octavia (1959–64)

1960s
 Škoda 1202 (1961–73)
 Škoda Octavia Combi (1964–71)
 Škoda 1000 MB (1964–69)
 Škoda 1203 (1968–99)
 Škoda 100/110 (1969–77)

1970s
 Škoda 110 R (1970–80)
Škoda 105/120/125 (1976–90)

1980s
 Škoda Garde (1981–84)
Škoda 130/135/136 (1984–90)
 Škoda Rapid (1984) (1984–90)
 Škoda Favorit/Forman/Pick-up (1987–95)

1990s
 Škoda Felicia (1994–2001)

2000s
 Škoda Roomster/Praktik – LAV (2006–2015)
 Škoda Superb second generation (2008–2015)
 Škoda Yeti – Mini SUV (2009–2017)
 Škoda Citigo (2011–2021)
 Škoda Rapid (India) (2011–2021)

Concept cars
 Vision 7S (2022)
 Afriq (2022)
 Vision IN (2020)
 Slavia Cabrio (2020)
 Vision GT (2019)
 Vision iV (2019)
 Mountiaq (2019)
 Vision RS (2018)
 Vision X (2018)
 Sunroq (2018)
 Vision E EU (2017)
 Vision E China (2017)
 Element (2017)
 Vision S (2016)
 Atero (2016)
 Funstar (2015)
 CitiJet (2014)
 Vision C (2013)
 MissionL (2011)
 Vision D (2011)
 Fabia Super (2007)
 Joyster (2006)
 Yeti II (2006)
 Roomster (2003)
 Tudor (2002)
 Fabia Paris Edition (2002)
 Ahoj (2002)
 Felicia Golden Prague (1998)
 783 Favorit Coupé (1987)
 Škoda 110 Super Sport Ferat (1971)
 Škoda 1100 GT (1968)
 Škoda 720 (1967–1972)
 Škoda F3 (1964)
 Škoda 1100 Type 968 (1958)
 Škoda 973 Babeta (1949)

See also 

 List of Škoda Auto engines

External links

 

Škoda
 
Škoda